Natascha Ausma (born 17 July 1996) is a Dutch judoka.

She is the gold medalist of the 2021 Judo Grand Slam Tbilisi in the -78 kg category.

References

External links
 

1996 births
Living people
Dutch female judoka
Sportspeople from Friesland
People from Opsterland
21st-century Dutch women